Allan Walker Blair (1900–1948) was a professor at the University of Alabama's medical school who is best known for allowing himself to be bitten by a black widow spider in order to investigate the toxicity of its venom in humans. As a result of the experiment he was hospitalized for two days, but later made a full recovery. The test convinced skeptics of the time who thought that the black widow's venom might not be dangerous to humans.

Early life and career

An Encyclopedia of Saskatchewan article notes that Allan Walker Blair was born in Brussels, Ontario. His family moved to Regina when he was 11. He earned a BA from the University of Saskatchewan and an MD CM degree from McGill University in Montreal, Canada, in 1928.

After teaching pathology at the University of Alabama [1929-34], he studied surgery at the Winnipeg General Hospital in Manitoba, Canada [1934-35].

Blair was the first Canadian awarded a Rockefeller Fellowship to study cancer at New York Memorial Hospital, in 1935–36.

He visited cancer treatment centers in Great Britain, Germany, Sweden, Belgium and France in 1936-37.

The Allan Blair Cancer Centre in Regina, Saskatchewan, Canada is named in honour of this doctor.

Envenomation experiment
The front-page headlines of the November 16, 1933, edition of the Tuscaloosa News read, "U. Of A. Professor Lets Spider Bite Him, Suffers 3 Days Agony." The physicians who attended to him praised him for "his courage but also for his persistence and skill in carrying on his investigation so long to such a successful conclusion."

"Blair chronicled the bite's effects on his body for two hours, until he could write no more. And then his assistants took over for the remaining two days."

According to the September 12, 1942, edition of The New Yorker, the results of his experiment were published in the Archives of Internal Medicine, December, 1934, issue. It was written by Samuel Hopkins Adams ["A Reporter at Large - Notes on an Unpleasant Female"] that Dr. Blair conducted the experiment, "with a view to providing an opportunity for complete scientific observation."

In 1933, many disagreed as to whether a Black Widow spider bite actually caused the symptoms reported. Until then, only a few tests had been completed and they lacked validity for various reasons. Further testing ensured that no other factors influenced the findings, as a true experiment must be conducted governed by strict controls. Most importantly, findings of tests must be replicable.

The experiment was named one of the top ten human interest stories of 1933.

In an article in The Wall Street Journal, Alex Boese stated, "A fellow entomologist had conducted the same self-experiment 12 years earlier."

In order to achieve a scientifically true effect, the findings must be that "which can be regularly reproduced by anyone who carries out the appropriate experiment in the way prescribed."

Dr. Blair was hoping to determine whether being bitten provided victims with any protection from the effects of a second bite. Unfortunately, the first bite proved so painful he chose not to place himself in the same position again. His decision not to repeat the test may also have been influenced by the fact that he had a wife and young family.
The physician in attendance was quoted as having never before witnessed "more abject pain manifested in any other medical or surgical condition."

References 

1900 births
1947 deaths
University of Alabama faculty
University of Saskatchewan alumni
McGill University Faculty of Medicine alumni